Manhattan is a borough of New York City.

Manhattan may also refer to:

Places
 Manhattan, California, a coastal town
 Manhattan, Colorado, a ghost town
 Manhattan, Florida, an unincorporated community
 Manhattan, Illinois, a village in Will County
 Manhattan Township, Will County, Illinois
 Manhattan, Indiana, an unincorporated community
 Manhattan, Kansas, a city
 Manhattan, Montana, a town
 Manhattan, Nevada, a town

Businesses
 The Manhattan Company, a bank in the United States from 1799 to 1955
 Manhattan Construction Company, a division of Rooney Holdings Inc.
 Manhattan Life Insurance Company, founded in 1850
 Hotel Manhattan, a former hotel in New York City

Ships
 Manhattan (1843 ship), a ship that made the first authorized United States visit to Tokyo Bay
 Manhattan (YTB-779), a large harbor tug serving from 1965 to 2004
 SS Manhattan (1931), a luxury liner
 SS Manhattan (1962), a tanker constructed to pass the Northwest Passage
 USS Manhattan (1863), a Union Navy ship in service until 1902

Music
 Manhattan Records, a record label
 The Manhattans, an R&B group from the 1970s and 80s
 Manhattan (Art Farmer album), 1981, or the title song
 Manhattan (Jeffrey Lewis & Los Bolts album), 2015
 Manhattan (Skaters album), 2014
 "Manhattan" (song), a song written in 1925 by Rodgers and Hart
 "Manhattan", a 1973 song by C. Jérôme
 "Manhattan", a 2009 song by the Kings of Leon from Only by the Night
 Manhattan (soundtrack), to the 1979 film
 The Manhattan Transfer, jazz and pop vocal quartet

Film and television
 Manhattan (1979 film), a film by Woody Allen
 Manhattan (1924 film), a film starring Richard Dix
 Manhattan (TV series), a 2014–2016 series
 "Manhattan" (Once Upon a Time), a 2013 episode of Once Upon a Time
 Manhattan, a fictional town in Manhattan, AZ

Schools
 Manhattan Christian College, Manhattan, Kansas
 Manhattan High School, Manhattan, Kansas
 Manhattan School, Manhattan, Nevada
 Manhattan School of Music, Manhattan, New York
 Manhattan College, Bronx, New York

Buildings
 Manhattan Laundry, a complex of historic buildings in Washington, D.C.
 Manhattan Tower, an apartment building in the Park Tzameret neighborhood of Tel Aviv, Israel

Other uses
 Manhattan (board game), a 1990s board game by Andreas Seyfarth
 Manhattan (cocktail), an alcoholic drink
 Manhattan, a 1979 novel by Neal Travis
 Manhattan Avenue (Brooklyn), in Williamsburg and Greenpoint, New York
 Manhattan Avenue (Manhattan), in Harlem and the Upper West Side, New York
 Manhattan Bridge, connecting Lower Manhattan and Brooklyn
 Manhattan Handicap, an American Thoroughbred horse race held annually at Belmont Park in Elmont, New York
 Manhattan Limited, a Pennsylvania Railroad that ran between Chicago and New York City until 1971
 Manhattan station, a commuter railroad station on Metra's SouthWest Service in Manhattan, Illinois
 Manhattan Theatre, a former Broadway theatre
 Manhattan Project, an operation that built the first nuclear weapons

People with the surname
 Avro Manhattan (1914–1990), a writer best known for his criticisms of the Roman Catholic Church

See also
 Doctor Manhattan, a character in the comic Watchmen
 Manhattan Building (disambiguation)
 Manhattan distance or Manhattan length, a distance relating to taxicab geometry
 Manhattan Project, an atomic bomb project
 Manhattan wiring, a technique for laying out circuits in computer engineering
 USS Manhattan, a list of ships
 Manhattan, Inc., a monthly magazine (1984–1990)
 
 Mainhattan, the business center of Frankfurt am Main